Parliamentary immunity, also known as legislative immunity, is a system in which political leadership position holders such as president, vice president, minister, governor, lieutenant governor, speaker, deputy speaker, member of parliament, member of legislative assembly, member of legislative council, senator, member of congress, corporator, councilor etc. are granted full immunity from legal prosecution, both civil prosecution and criminal prosecution, in the course of the execution of their official duties.

Advocates of parliamentary immunity suggest the doctrine is necessary to keep a check on unauthorised use of power of the judiciary, to maintain judicial accountability, and to promote the health of democratic institutions.

Westminster system countries

Legislators in countries using the Westminster system, such as the United Kingdom, are protected from civil action and criminal law for slander and libel by parliamentary immunity whilst they are in the House. This protection is part of the privileges afforded the Houses of Parliament under the Common Law         (parliamentary privilege). Parliamentary immunity from criminal prosecution is not enjoyed by Members of Parliament under the Westminster system. This lack of criminal immunity is derived from the key tenet of the British Constitution that all are equal before the law.

Brazil
The 1988 Brazilian constitution grants parliamentary immunity to members of both the Chamber of Deputies and the Senate. Unlike other countries, Brazilian parliamentary immunity is also extended to crimes committed outside a parliamentarian's official duties (murder, theft, etc.). This does not apply for crimes committed before the member of parliament takes office. Members of parliament can be arrested only for crimes if caught at the time of the criminal act in flagrante for a crime with no possibility of bail. These arrests can be overruled by a floor vote of the particular parliament chamber that parliamentarian belongs to.

Criminal proceedings may be suspended for crimes committed only after a parliamentarian begins his term of office, and requests for suspensions need to be approved by majority of members of Parliament. Members of the National Congress as well as other high level politicians are prosecuted and judged exclusively by the Supreme Court, as opposed to the lower courts.

As of 2007, no Brazilian politician has ever been convicted by the Supreme Federal Tribunal of any crime since parliamentary immunity was instituted in 1988.

After the Mensalão scandal in 2005, the Supreme Federal Tribunal surprised many when, on August 24, 2007, it accepted the indictments of 40 individuals, most of which are former or current federal deputies, all of which were allies of Brazilian president Luiz Inácio Lula da Silva.

France

Members of the Parliament of France enjoy irresponsibility for what they did as parliamentarians, and partial inviolability – that is, severe restrictions for the police or justice to arrest or detain them. Both irresponsibility and inviolability are mandated by article 26 of the Constitution of France.

These dispositions are somewhat controversial, following abuse of such privileges.

Germany

Article 46 of Germany's Constitution states: "At no time may a Member be subjected to court proceedings or disciplinary action or otherwise called to account outside the Bundestag for a vote cast or for any speech or debate in the Bundestag or in any of its committees," with exceptions made for "defamatory insults."
It also states that "a Member may not be called to account or arrested for a punishable offence without permission of the Bundestag unless he is apprehended while committing the offence or in the course of the following day."
Furthermore, the Bundestag may also order that a detainment or prosecution of a member be suspended.

The states of Germany also have similar procedures for their legislative bodies.

Greece
Members of the Hellenic Parliament are immune from criminal prosecution, arrest or detention while in office, with the exception of crimes committed in flagrante delicto. They are also immune from having to provide any information to any authority regarding their legislative functions and deliberations. However, both the Constitution and the Standing Orders allow for the Public Prosecutor's Office to request from Parliament to lift an MP's immunity for a particular crime, with MPs deciding through open balloting. Alleged crimes committed by members of the Cabinet (including non-MPs) or the President of the Republic are first investigated by an ad hoc parliamentary committee, with MPs then voting on the committee's recommendations. Should parliament determine that there is sufficient evidence for prosecution, an ad hoc Special Court is set up.

Italy
Parliamentary immunity in Italy was re-instated in 1948 by the Constituent Assembly, to prevent cases such as "Francesco Saverio Nitti, whose house was searched and ransacked by the fascist police in the fall of 1923; Giacomo Matteotti, murdered by fascists June 10, 1924 for his work as a deputy of opposition; Giovanni Amendola, beaten in Montecatini in 1925 and died in Cannes in April 1926; Antonio Gramsci, whose parliamentary mandate was revoked on Nov. 9, 1926 and who was tried in 1928 by a special court for his activities as a Member of Parliament and as a political opponent. The same court had him imprisoned and his correspondence was seized".

Immunity was limited in 1993, but abuse continues by means of denying authorizations to certain judiciary acts, like wiretapping; therefore, in the final judgment, the Constitutional Court often overturns the decisions of Parliament to protect its members, authorising the activities of the judiciary.

Spain
In Spain, parliamentarians in the national Congress of Deputies and Senators as well as legislators serving in regional administrations and certain members of the Spanish Royal Family are afforded '', thus becoming '' (lit. 'afforded ones') and enjoy privileges granted in the  Constitution of Spain. These self-regulatory organizations' membership privileges are reflected in the following parliamentary prerogatives:

 Inviolability: Legislators can not be judicially prosecuted  for opinions expressed or votes cast in the exercise of their official duties (Article 71.1 of the Spanish Constitution of 1978). 
Immunity: Legislators may only be detained in flagrante delicto, and so plaintiffs and prosecutors  must seek authorisation from the assembly in which the accused is elected before any legal process is initiated (Article 71.2 of the Spanish Constitution of 1978). although the final authority rests with the Supreme Court of Spain
 Specific jurisdiction: Parliamentarians can only be judged in the first instance by the Supreme Court, a practice that has been criticised as potentially undermining any right of appeal to a higher court.

Currently, there are 10,000 persons in Spain with parliamentary immunity, and only a fifth of them are politicians.

Turkey
Between 26 October 1961 and 12 March 1998 Turkish prosecutors made 2,713 requests to suspend the immunity of 1,151 deputies. Only 29 requests were granted. Six of these were the deputies of the Democracy Party arrested in 1994 because of their openly support for the Kurdistan Workers' Party  (PKK) and separatist activities like the one as Leyla Zana wore a napkin in the Kurdish colors red, green, yellow.

In connection with the Ergenekon trials (from 2008), some accused have been selected as parliamentary candidates specifically to give them legal protection via parliamentary immunity.

On 20 May 2016, an amendment to the Constitution has been passed by the Parliament, removing parliamentary immunity. Due to surpassing the two-thirds majority threshold, the amendment was able to pass without a constitutional referendum. In November of the same year, nine members of parliament of the Peoples Democratic Party (HDP) were arrested. On the 4 June 2020 another three Turkish MPs were dismissed from parliament and arrested, two from the HDP and one from the Republican People's Party (CHP).

Ukraine
Article 80 of the Ukrainian Constitution states that parliamentary immunity is guaranteed to the peoples' deputies of Ukraine. The peoples' deputies of Ukraine do not have legal responsibility for their votes and opinions in  parliament and its appendent bodies, except for responsibility for insult or defamation.

United States

Mason's Manual notes, "The courts, by a series of decisions, have explained away almost every essential feature of the privilege from arrest as it once existed...A member of the legislature has no right to physically resist an officer attempting to make an arrest to the extent of assaulting such officer."

Members of the United States Congress enjoy a similar parliamentary privilege as members of the British Parliament; that is, they cannot be prosecuted for anything they say on the floor of the House or Senate. They also enjoy the right to be present in Congress: that is, they may be in prison or jail the rest of the time, but they have the right to attend Congressional sessions, speak on the floor, vote, etc. These rights are specified in the Constitution and have been fairly uncontroversial in U.S. history. Courts have consistently interpreted them very narrowly.

Several state constitutions provided equivalent protections for members of state legislatures.

Vietnam
National Assembly deputies and delegates of the People's Council are protected from being arrested and prosecuted. National Assembly deputies cannot be dismissed or sacked by the agency, organization or unit where the deputy works. These protections can be revoked by the National Assembly or the People's Council, respectively.
LAW ON ORGANIZATION OF THE NATIONAL ASSEMBLY
LAW ON ORGANIZATION OF LOCAL GOVERNMENT

References

External links
 J.P.Joseph Maingot with David Dehler, Politicians Above the Law: A case for the abolition of parliamentary inviolability (Baico Publishing 2011)
 Josh Chafetz, Democracy's Privileged Few: Legislative Privilege and Democratic Norms in the British and American Constitutions (Yale Univ. Press 2006)
 Simon Wigley, 'Parliamentary Immunity: Protecting Democracy or Protecting Corruption?, 'Journal of Political Philosophy, Vol. 11, No.2, pp. 23–40.
 Erskine May, Parliamentary Practice: The Law, Privileges, Proceedings and Usage of Parliament, W.R. Mackay et al. (eds) (London: Butterworths, 2004)
 Simon McGee, Rules on Parliamentary Immunity in the European Parliament and the Member States of the European Union, (Brussels: European Parliament, ECPRD, 2001).
 UK Parliament, Reports of the Joint Committee on Parliamentary Privilege in Session HL 43-I/ HC 214-I. (London: The Stationery Office Limited, 1999).
 Marc Van der Hulst, The Parliamentary Mandate. (Geneva: Inter-Parliamentary Union, 2001)
 L'immunité parlementaire, French National Assembly

Criminal procedure
Legal immunity
Legislatures